Nast may refer to:

People 
Charlotte Georgia Nast (1905–1991), American botanist
 Condé Montrose Nast (1873–1942), American journalist and entrepreneur
Condé Nast, the publication company founded by C. M. Nast
 Jean Népomucène Hermann Nast (1754–1817), Austrian artist and entrepreneur
 Thomas Nast, (1840–1902) German-born American caricaturist and editorial cartoonist
 William Nast (Methodist) (1807–1899), American religious leader
 William F. Nast (1840–1893), American business manager

Organizations 
 Manufacture de Nast, a porcelain factory founded by Jean Népomucène Hermann Nast
 See also organizations with acronym NAST (disambiguation)